Stanton William "Stan" Root (1924 – 1973) was an Australian rugby league footballer who played in the 1940s and 1950s.

Career 
Graded from St George's victorious President Cup team in 1941, Stan Root had a long career at the St. George club that was interrupted by World War II. He finished his career as the captain/coach of Narromine Rugby League Club in 1952.

Personal life 
Root was the son of rugby league player Eddie Root. He died at the age of 49 on 17 June 1973.

References

1924 births
1973 deaths
Australian rugby league players
Australian rugby league coaches
St. George Dragons players
Australian military personnel of World War II
Rugby league players from Sydney
Rugby league wingers